Pipe Dream is a 2002 romantic comedy film, starring Mary-Louise Parker and Martin Donovan. The film was directed by John C. Walsh, who previously wrote and directed the film Ed's Next Move.

Plot summary
In New York City, David (Donovan), a plumber who is unsuccessful with women, creates a new identity as David Coppolberg, a film director, as a way to meet women. Due to his good looks and unfamiliarity with film, which passes for inscrutability, he is considered an indie talent. Complicating the situation is the script stolen from Toni (Parker), who in turn uses his success to further her own ambitions.

Cast
 Martin Donovan as David Kulovic 
 Mary-Louise Parker as Toni Edelman 
 Rebecca Gayheart as Marliss Funt
 Anthony Arkin as Cousin Mike
 Marla Sucharetza as Lorna Hufflitz
 Kevin Carroll as RJ Martling
 Kevin Sussman as James
 Natalie B. Pyper as Melanie Phillips
 Guinevere Turner as Diane Beltrami
 Peter Jacobson as Arnie Hufflitz
 Jill Hennessy as Marina Peck

Reception
Entertainment Weekly film critic Owen Gleiberman called Pipe Dream "One of the funniest films I've seen this year...". The picture was also dubbed "neo screwball" by Karen Durbin of the New York Times. Durbin notes, "In bringing class tensions into play for his sparring lovers, Mr. Walsh...revives an aspect of classic screwball that has become almost taboo in Hollywood even as the sexual strictures that once fueled the genre have dissolved."

Pipe Dream was featured in Los Angeles Times film critic Kenneth Turan's 2004 book Never Coming To A Theater Near You. The book features a group of some less-widely seen films he felt deserved more attention. Of this film and John C. Walsh's previous film Ed's Next Move, Turan writes, "The two films share Walsh's unmistakable sensibility, a gentle and unforced way of examining the vagaries of human behaviour that is as sure-handed and insightful as it is understated."

References

External links 
 
 
 

2002 films
2002 romantic comedy films
American romantic comedy films
Films set in New York City
2000s English-language films
2000s American films